Bandelin  is a municipality in the Vorpommern-Greifswald district, in Mecklenburg-Vorpommern, Germany, consisting of the villages Kuntzow, Schmoldow, Vargatz, and Bandelin.

Location
Bandelin is about 15 km south of Greifswald and approximately 3 km northwest of Gützkow.

References

Vorpommern-Greifswald